Saint-Pierre-la-Noue is a commune in the department of Charente-Maritime within southwestern France. The municipality was established on 1 March 2018 with the merge of the former communes of Saint-Germain-de-Marencennes (the seat) and Péré.

See also 
Communes of the Charente-Maritime department

References 

Saintpierrelanoue
Populated places established in 2018
2018 establishments in France